"Tu Amor" (English: "Your Love") is a song written by Diane Warren for Jon B.'s album Cool Relax.

RBD version

"Tu Amor" was later covered by Mexican pop group RBD. It was the first single released from their fourth and first all-English studio album, Rebels (2006). The song was composed by Diane Warren. The lead vocals on "Tu Amor" are sung only by Christian Chávez, while the rest of the group provides background vocals on the choruses. "Tu Amor" is a romantic song with a melodic pop style and Latin music influences. The single continued to open doors for RBD, since it had great success in various parts of the world like Japan, Romania, Slovenia, Israel, Russia, and France, where the group won an award for the song.

Release
According to writer Diane Warren and Mediabase, the song was released to American radio on September 22, 2006, after having been leaked to the Internet before its release date. "Tu Amor" officially debuted on the On Air with Ryan Seacrest radio morning show on KIIS-FM in Los Angeles, California. According to AllMusic, the single was released on CD in the United States on November 24, 2006. The song was later featured on the telenovela Rebelde when it was aired on TV5 in the Philippines.

Music video
The music video for "Tu Amor" was shot on a beach in Los Angeles, California. MTV Tres premiered the video on October 23, 2006, where it made its debut at number six on the Mi TRL music video countdown. The video was also aired on MTV Hits. The video shows the group enjoying a day at the beach singing and having fun, and later having a cozy bonfire at night. Fans noticed that there were only solo shots of band member Christopher in the video, not being shown together with the rest of the group. This was due to the fact that Christopher was not present for some reason at the time the other band members were shooting the video. His scenes were filmed later and eventually edited into the video.

Live performances 
In the 2006 edition of Walmart Soundcheck, a performance series by the Walmart retail chain to promote albums being released, the group performed "Tu Amor" for the first time. On November 24, 2006, after RBD's English interview on Yahoo! Music, the group also performed "Tu Amor". In 2007, the group appeared on the US music TV show CD USA to perform the single. Later, on July 25, 2007, the group performed "Tu Amor" on the acoustic music TV show Confesiones en Concierto on Ritmoson Latino. RBD's third worldwide concert tour, the Tour Celestial, also included performances of "Tu Amor" as part of its setlist.

Critical reception 
Jason Birchmeier of AllMusic commented that "Tu Amor", the lead single from Rebels, was "perfect for the project" due to its "simplicity" and "production". He also complimented Christian Chávez' vocals, stating that Chávez is "the most fluent singer in the group, with the chorus sung in unison by the group – it's a single tailor-made for Tres".

Commercial performance 
The song became RBD's second single to chart on the US Billboard Hot 100, where it reached position number 65, the highest peak of the group's career on the chart. In Japan, however, the song managed to hit number 30 on the country's singles chart.

Formats and track listings
US CD single
"Tu Amor" (Radio Edit) – 3:50
"Tu Amor" (Album Version) – 4:37

US CD maxi-single
"Tu Amor" (Radio Edit) – 3:50
"Tu Amor" (Album Version) – 4:37
"Tu Amor" (Chico Latino Remix Radio Edit) – 3:28
"Tu Amor" (Music video)

Navidad Mix digital download (iTunes only)
"Tu Amor" (Navidad Mix) – 4:43

Virtual show
"Tu Amor" (En vivo)" – 4:37

Credits and personnel
Recording locations
 Realsongs Studio D (Hollywood, California)
 Igloo Music Studios (Burbank, California) 
 Studio 19 (Mexico City, Mexico) 

Mixing locations
 Integrated Studios (New York City, New York)
 Realsongs Studio D (Hollywood, California) 

Vocals
RBD – main vocals, background vocals
Khris Kellow – background vocals
Martín Cintrón – background vocals

Musicians
Martín Cintrón – guitars

Production

Khris Kellow – arrangements, producer, programming, vocal production on "Navidad Mix"
Diane Warren – executive producer
Orlando Calzada – mixing
Nick Nastasi – mixing assistant
Tyler Coomes – programming
Mario Luccy – engineer, mixing on "Navidad Mix"
Michael Anthony Rodríguez – executive producer
Sara Klinger – executive producer assistant
Fernando Roldán – recording engineer 
Gustavo Borner  – recording engineer 
Carlos Lara  – vocal production

Awards

Charts

Release history

References

1997 songs
2006 singles
Pop ballads
Macaronic songs
Music videos directed by Diane Martel
Jon B. songs
RBD songs
Songs written by Diane Warren
Articles containing video clips